Palmerston is a rural locality split between the Tablelands Region and the Cassowary Coast Region, Queensland, Australia.

History 
The locality is believed to be named after explorer Christie Palmerston.

References 

Cassowary Coast Region
Localities in Queensland